The Mazzarella clan is a Campanian Camorra clan operating in the city of Naples. The clan is historically considered one of the most powerful groups of the Camorra.

History 
The clan was founded in the 1960s by the Mazzarella brothers, Ciro known as 'o Scellone, Gennaro and Vincenzo, as a ramification of the Zaza clan, then headed by the historical boss Michele Zaza, who was a relative of the Mazzarella brothers. The organization started dedicating to the cigarette smuggling, establishing itself from the Borgo Santa Lucia to Posillipo, and from Bagnoli to Pozzuoli. The Mazzarella clan grew rapidly and became independent from the Zazas, thanks to Ciro Mazzarella, who since the 1960s demonstrated his entrepreneurial abilities, buying small ships and starting his own smuggling empire.

In the 1970s, the organization was already dubbed by the media as the kings of cigarette smuggling, however, during the eighties and nineties the organization ended up involved in many Camorra wars, in particular against the Contini clan, which led to the death of dozens of affiliates including the father of the Mazzarella brothers, Francesco, killed in an ambush in 1998, with an increase in February of the same year which led to ten deaths in nine days.

In the late 1980s the Mazzarellas formed a strong alliance with the Misso and Sarno clans, called Misso-Mazzarella-Sarno, to oppose to the rising power of the Secondigliano Alliance, headed by the Licciardi, Mallardo and Contini bosses. However, in 2008, this alliance was broken after the fall of the Sarno clan, bringing the eastern suburbs of Naples to a new and bloody war.

In 1996 Marianna, daughter of Luigi Giuliano, boss of the Giuliano clan, married Michele Mazzarella, son of Vincenzo Mazzarella, the union served to strengthen the relations between the two most important clans of Camorra in the 1990s.

The clan has a long history of rivalry with the Rinaldi clan, which caused dozens of deaths from the bloody wars between the two groups.

According to revelations made by pentitos of the clan, despite the degree of kinship among the founders of the organization, the Mazzarellas are not united as it seems, actually, each brother has an area of their own influence inside the several territories dominated by the clan. The clan is virtually fragmented into three independent groups.

Ciro Mazzarella 

Born in Naples on April 2, 1940, Ciro Mazzarella aka 'o Scellone, was considered the true heir of Michele Zaza, having strong relations with the Sicilian Mafia, in particular with the Catania's Clans. According to justice collaborators, the late boss of the Catanian Mafia, Giuseppe Calderone was the godparent in the baptism of one of the Mazzarella's sons.

'O Scellone had also good relationships with other powerful bosses of the Camorra,  such as Mario Fabbrocino and Alfredo Maisto. He was also seen in the company of Vincenzo Casillo of the Nuova Camorra Organizzata, in fact, Mazzarella never took a side in the war between the Nuova Famiglia and the NCO, despite the top position Michele Zaza held inside the NF.

In the early 1990s Mazzarella had amassed great wealth, in 1992 he decided to move to Switzerland, after losing a war between Camorra clans in Naples. From his logistics base in Lugano, he created an enviable economic Empire with cigarette smuggling that arrived from Montenegro. According to the parliamentary inquiry commission of 1996, Ciro Mazzarella headed a true illegal Empire: 200 billion lire in turnover, for a net profit of over 6 billion lire monthly (€4,4 million monthly, in today's exchange). In 2002 he was arrested in Spain, and after his release from prison in 2006, he returned to live in Naples.

On September 2, 2018, Ciro Mazzarella, died in his villa in the affluent neighbourhood of Posillipo, Naples at the age of 78.

Historical leaderships 

Ciro Mazzarella known as 'o Scellone (Naples, April 2, 1940 - Naples, September 2, 2018)
 Gennaro Mazzarella known as 'o Schizzo (Naples, September 25, 1949)
 Vincenzo Mazzarella known as ‘o Pazzo (Naples,  May 8, 1956 - Milan, November 5, 2018)
 Ciro Mazzarella (Naples, May 3, 1971)

Activities 
Since the 20th century, the clan is known to be also active in France. In 2004 Vincenzo Mazzarella, one of the founders of the organization, was arrested in Paris. Mazzarella was reportedly dealing diamonds with African criminals in the country.

In 2009, Ciro Mazzarella, born in 1971,  was arrested in Santo Domingo, Dominican Republic. In the country, he lived in a luxurious residence and held the reins of the clan especially for the management of drug trafficking.

According to the Spanish police, in Spain the clan is active in Marbella, Fuengirola, Zaragoza and Ceuta.

Operating from Barcelona, Salvatore Zazo, one of the top members of the clan, was allegedly involved in a large scheme of international cocaine trafficking from Peru to Europe, with the intention to acquire total control of the Port of Callao; one of his contacts was the drug lord Gerald Oropeza, one of the biggest traffickers in Peru. According to the DEA, Zazo would manage more than U$500 million per year in shipments of cocaine through the ports of the country to Europe.

According to the Direzione Investigativa Antimafia, the clan has alliances with Albanian mafia groups.

In recent years, the new leaders of the Russo clan, from Nola, also formed an alliance with the Mazzarellas.

Present day 
According to the reports of the DIA about the Camorra in 2019, the Mazzarella clan, despite the death of two of its founders, is still one of the most powerful organizations in Campania, dominating the territory in various neighbourhoods, and having numerous groups under their influence.

The current leader of the organization is Ciro Mazzarella, born in 1971, who controls the powerful organization from his stronghold in the Mercato area, in Naples.

See also
 Camorra
 List of members of the Camorra
 Michele Zaza
 List of Camorra clans
 Contini clan

References

1960s establishments in Italy
Camorra clans
Organized crime groups in France
Organized crime groups in Peru
Organised crime groups in Spain